Nationality words link to articles with information on the nation's poetry or literature (for instance, Irish or France).

Events

Works published
 Vittoria Colonna, Canzoniere ("Songbook"), lyric poems—mostly sonnets, but also canzoni and capitoli in terza rima, keeping to classical Petrarchan style; the first section refers to her late husband, the second to religion and morals; a fourth edition of her amatory and elegiac poems, including a larger proportion of pious works, published in Venice; Italy
 Bonaventure des Périers, Recueil des Œuvres de feu Bonaventure des Périers, including his poems, published following his suicide, in Lyon, France
 Clément Marot, Œuvres, edition in definitive arrangement, in Lyon, France
 Maurice Scève, Délie, objet de plus haute vertu ("Delia, Object of the Highest Virtue"), lyric poetry, the first French canzoniere of love poems, inspired by the style of Petrarch, the poem dedicated to his young student, Pernette du Guillet; made up of 449 decasyllabic dizains (traditional 10-line strophes) and a prefatory huitain (eight-line strophe); illustrated with 50 emblematic woodcuts; the work for which the author is best known; France

Births
Death years link to the corresponding "[year] in poetry" article:
 March 11 – Torquato Tasso (died 1595), Italian
 Guillaume de Salluste Du Bartas (died 1590), French writer and poet
 George Turberville, also spelled "George Turbervile", born about this year (died c. 1597), English poet and translator
Also:
 Giovanni Botero (died 1617), Italian political theorist, priest, poet, and diplomat
 Dadu Dayal (died 1603), Indian Sant Mat, poet, and philosopher
 Robert Garnier (died 1590), French poet and playwright
 Ginés Pérez de Hita born about this year (died 1619), Spanish novelist and poet
 José de Sigüenza (died 1606), Spanish historian, poet and theologian
 George Whetstone born about this year (died c. 1587), English playwright, poet and author

Deaths
Birth years link to the corresponding "[year] in poetry" article:
 September 12 – Clément Marot (born 1496), French
 December 9 – Teofilo Folengo (born 1491), Italian
 Antonius Arena, also known as "Antoine Arènes" (born 1500), jurist and poet
 Bonaventure des Périers (born c. 1510), French author and poet (suicide)

See also

 Poetry
 16th century in poetry
 16th century in literature
 French Renaissance literature
 Renaissance literature
 Spanish Renaissance literature

Notes

16th-century poetry
Poetry